Robin Kool (born 22 December 1999), better known as ropz, is an Estonian professional Counter-Strike: Global Offensive player for FaZe Clan. Kool has played in six Majors and won the PGL Major Antwerp 2022.

Early and personal life 
Kool was born on 22 December 1999. He grew up in Jõgeva, Estonia.

Career 

Before Kool joined mousesports, he played Call of Duty for Team Horizon; he played as a sniper. Kool joined mousesports around April 2017 and has obtained nine trophies while with the team. He was regarded as the MVP of the ESL Pro League Season 10 Finals and has consistently been in HLTV's top 20 list of players since 2018 (Respectively #19, #10, #7 and #18). Kool earned back-to-back top 10 spots on the list in 2019 and 2020.

After playing almost five years with mousesports, Kool joined FaZe Clan in January 2022. His switch turned out to be successful, they qualified to the BLAST Premier: Spring Finals and won the first LAN tournament of the year – IEM Katowice 2022. This was followed by Faze and ropz winning second consecutive title at ESL Pro League Season 15 and ropz being named the tournament MVP.

Notable tournament results 
Bold denotes a CS:GO Major

References 

1999 births
Living people
Counter-Strike players
Estonian esports players
Sportspeople from Jõgeva